This is a list of national costumes, mainly bunads, worn by either members of the Norwegian people or members of the Sami people of Norway or members of the Kven people of Norway.

Rural clothes vs. folk costumes 

Bunad is a Norwegian umbrella term encompassing a range of both traditional rural clothes mostly dating to the 19th and 18th centuries as well as 20th-century folk costumes. In its narrow sense, the word bunad refers only to clothes designed in the early 20th century that are loosely based on traditional costumes. The word bunad is in itself a 20th-century invention.

The Sami people use their distinctive traditional costumes, especially on festive occasions.  Kven people also have their traditional Finnish inspired clothing.

Bunads by province 
The term drakt is used for the ensemble of clothing worn by either a man or a woman. In some districts the folk costume will be called drakt, and in other districts the term bunad has taken precedence.

Østfold 
 Østfoldbunad
 Løkendrakt
 Smaalenenes mannsbunad (male costume from the district of Smaalenene
 Fredrikstaddrakt
 Eidsbergdrakt
 Hobøldrakt
 Hvalerdrakt
 Mossedrakt
 Festdrakt til Østfoldrosen

Oslo and Akershus 
 Romeriksbunad
 Hurdalsbunad
 Eidsvollsbunad
 Lillestrømsdrakt
 Follobunad
 Bærumsbunad
 Askerbunad
 Akerdrakt
 Oslodrakt
 Sørkedalsbunad

Hedmark 
 Hedmarksbunad
 Vallsetbunad
 Østerdalsbunad
 Sør-Østerdalsbunad
 Nord-Østerdalsbunad
 Kviknebunad
 Folldalsbunad
 Dalåsstakk
 Lødrupbunad
 Maria Aaen-bunad
 Alvdalsbunad
 Trysilbunad
 Solør og Odalsbunad
 Finnskogsbunad
 Lundebydrakt
 Vålerdrakt
 Brattfossdrakt
 Lunderseterdrakt
 Hedemarksbunad – 1955 – modell
 Hedemarksbunad – 1985 – modell
 Rekonstruert kvinnebunad fra Hedemarken

Oppland 
 Gudbrandsdalsbunad
 Lesjabunad
 Grafferbunad
 Gausdalsbundad
 Dovrebunad
 Jordebunad
 Lillehammerbunad
 Hadelandsbunad
 Totendrakt
 Vestopplandbunad
 Valdresbunad
 Etnedalskjolen
 Rondastakk og rutaliv
 Trykktykjol
 Gudbrandsdalens mannsbunad
 Kvinnebunad fra Gudbransdalen
 Gudbrandsdalens festbunad
 Damask-kjol
 1700-talls mannsbunad og kvinnebunad fra Gudbransdalen
 Landingsdrakt
 Totendrakt
 Den gamle Valdresbunaden
 Den nye Valdresbunaden
 Rutastakken fra Valdres
 Mannsbunad fra Valdres

Buskerud 
 Stakker fra Hallingdal
 Mannsbunad fra Hallingdal
 Festbunad fra Nedre Hallingdal
 Brudebunad fra Hallingdal
 Ringeriksbunad
 Den gamle Ringeriksdrakt
 Flesbergstakk
 Skjælingskleda fra Øvre Numedal
 Gråtrøye
 Rundtrøye
 Bergmannsdrakt fra Kongsberg

Vestfold 
 Vestfold Husflidslags
 Kvinnebunad – 1932-modell
 Vestfold Husflidslags kvinnebunad – 1956-modell
 Vestfold Husflidslags mannsbunad

Telemark 
 Øst-Telemark Stakk og Liv
 Øst-Telemark Raudtrøyebunad
 Øst-Telemark Beltestakk
 Øst-Telemark Tinn-bunad
 Øst-Telemark Gråtrøye
 Kvinnebunad fra Vest-Telemark
 Vest-Telemark Bringerklutbunad
 Vest-Telemark Gråtrøye
 Vest-Telemark Svart modell og Rundtrøye

Aust-Agder 
 Åmlibunad fra Aust-Agder for kvinner
 Åmlibunad fra Aust-Agder for menn
 Setesdalsbunad

Vest-Agder 
 Mannsdrakt fra Vest-Agder
 Kvinnedrakt fra Vest-Agder, Stripestakk
 Kvinnedrakt fra Vest-Agder
 Rynkestakk og Plissestakk
 Brudedrakt fra Vest-Agder
 Øyebunaden

Rogaland 
 Rogalandsbunad herre
 Husflidens Rogalandsbunad, Mønster "Løland"
 Kronebunad fra Rogaland

Hordaland 
 Askøybunad
 Fanabunad
 Hardangerbunad
 Nordhordlandsbunad
 Sunnhordalandsbunad
 Vinterbunad fra Voss
 Konebunad fra Voss
 Jentebunad fra Voss
 Brudebunad fra Voss

Sogn og Fjordane 
 Nordfjordbunad
 Sognebunad
 Sunnfjordbunad

Møre og Romsdal 
 Nordmørsbunaden
 Norddalsbunaden
 Ørskogbunaden
 Skodjebunaden
 Strandabunaden
 Hjørundfjordbunaden
 Jentebunaden fra Sunnmøre
 Sykkylsvsbunaden
 Vigrabunaden
 Søre Sunnmørebunaden
 Mannsbunad fra Sunnmøre
 Guttebunad fra Sunnmøre
 Brun mannsbunad fra Sunnmøre
 Kvinnedrakt fra Sunnmøre
 Kronebunad fra Sunnmøre
 Rindalsbunaden
 Brudedrakt for Nordmøre
 Ørstabunaden

Sør-Trøndelag 
 Oppdalsbunaden
 Trønderbunaden
 Tydalsdrakten
 Selbubunad

Nord-Trøndelag 
 Nord-trønderbunad

Nordland 
 Nordlandsbunaden
 Hamarøybunaden
 Lofotbunaden
 Mannsbunad for Nordland/Troms
 Ofotbunaden
 Sámi costumes (See Finnmark)

Troms 
 Mannsbunad for Nordland/Troms
 Tromsbunaden for kvinner
 Kvænangsbunaden
 Målselvbunaden
 Lenvikdrakten
 Senjadrakten
 Sámi costumes (See also Finnmark)

Finnmark 
 Finnmarksbunad
 Gákti/Luhkka (Sámi costumes)
 Kvendrakta (Kven costume)

Svalbard 
 Svalbardbunad

References 

 http://www.norskebunader.no/en Norske bunader (+ short film at YouTube)
 Bjørn Sverre Hol Haugen: Norsk bunadleksikon Damm forlag 2006 
 Husfliden Norske Bunader Husfliden – Norges Husflidslag 1998 

Bunad
Norwegian clothing
Norway
Romantic nationalism